Eino Vihtori Kaakkolahti (April 25, 1929 — June 25, 2014) was a Finnish pesäpallo player.

During his 18 seasons in the Finnish championship league, he won a total of 10 medals and 6 awards, and was chosen Pesäpallo Player of the Year in 1961. In 1973 and '74, Kaakkolahti was vice chairman of Suomen Pesäpalloliitto (The Finnish Pesäpallo Association, or PPL for short).

Eino Kaakkolahti's little brother, Matti Kaakkolahti, is a ski jumping medalist and has played pesäpallo in the Finnish series.

Achievements

References 

1929 births
2014 deaths
Finnish sportsmen
Pesäpallo players at the 1952 Summer Olympics
Pesäpallo players